Paniliakos Football Club is a Greek association football club based in Pyrgos, Elis, Greece. The club plays in Gamma Ethniki, the third tier of Greek football. It plays its home matches at the Pyrgos Stadium.

Paniliakos was the team of Serbia and Montenegro international Predrag Đorđević, before moving to Olympiacos, Greece international Stelios Giannakopoulos, and of Vassilis Lakis, also a Greece international.

History

Early years 
The football at Pyrgos began to spread, in particular, in the early 20th century. Initially, it was embraced by popular mass and gradually gaining more and more people. Pittsburghs with improvised balls in each neighborhood were, with time passing, into the new sport and they loved football. One of the first football matches in Pyrgos was the struggle of a group of Pyrgians against a group of English workers who lived in the port of Katakolo.
The history of football in the form of clubs in Pyrgos begins during the interwar period. One of the first teams of the city (along with Ermis Pyrgos) was Iraklis Pyrgos, who had been unofficially founded in 1918 and gained an official statute in 1923. He had fought with claims in the championship of the FCA Patras, since Elis did not have her own football league, having even claimed the title in some cases (in 1931 she had quite a strong team finishing, finally, as 2nd). Heracles was based in the area of the old hospital, while the chairman of the team was the factory-owner Karavasilis. The colors of Hercules were blue and white. One of the most powerful Pyrgos teams, as well as one of the teams that later created Panileo, was the National Tower. The National was founded in 1927, but after a while, the club was inactive and re-established in 1938. He also fought at the National Technical University of Athens Patron. The Ethnikos team was particularly popular in the working class, as it was basically a group of the people, and many times he did not have a chairman, or his position was of no particular importance. Of course, the chairman of the team was also the founder of Paniliakos, Nikos Lampaounas. The National was fighting in the area where the National Stadium is currently located, and he also had, at times, a quite credible team. The colors of the team were green and white.
The third team of Pyrgos, with the association of which Paniliakos was created with the two above, was AEK. Pyrgos, which was created in 1929 by G. Pavlidis. The AEK. it re-opened after the end of the war in 1944. Its colors, of course, were yellow and black and had its headquarters in the area of Chalikiatika. She also played in the championship of the FCA Patras. From AEK Pyrgos' great players, who later starred in Paniliakos, such as Theodoros Theocharopoulos and Michalis Kladidianos.
In 1956–57, the three Pyrgos teams had a very bad year finishing last in the Regional Championship of the FCA Patras. Thus, the big decision was taken that would change the history of football in Pyrgos and Elis, in general, for the creation of a unified club in the city.

Formation 
In 1957, Iraklis Pyrgos, Ethnikos Pyrgos and AEK Pyrgos they will unite and make Paniliakos (although the official year of the team is founded in 1958), choosing as the colors of the new club the red and the white. Paniliakos was the team that was to become the most powerful of Elis. The choice of the name wanted to show the representation of the general region of Elis by the club. The following year, Paniliakos and Apollon Pyrgos (players of Apollon) were to be included.
From 1958 until 1965, Paniliakos would compete in the championship of the Hellenic Football Championship of Patras, just like the previous groups of Pyrgos (had lost the rise to the Second National since the Thyella Patras in 1963). In the year 1965–66, the 3rd National category will be established and Paniliakos will participate in it. In the 1970–71 season with AEK's old ace, Kostas Nestoridis, on the bench will win the 2nd National Division (preceded by the 1969–70 and the 1964–65 in Olympiacos Patras).
1971–72 will be the first time the team will take part in the 2nd National Championship. From there on, Paniliakos would move between the 2nd and 3rd National. The 1982–83 season will be the last year for Paniliakos in the 2nd National, as in 1983 he will be relegated after a bad year to 3rd National where he will stay until the 1986–87 season.
From then on, there will be the "stone" years of the team, since 1987–88, the Paniliakos competitor with many problems (mainly administrative) will be demoted by the 4th National. Thus, the 1988–89 season will find Paniliakos in the history of the competitor in the 1st class of the National Technical University of Athens Elis. However, where everything seemed ominous for the future of the club, after the instigation of some of his close friends, the Elder businessman, Sakis Stavropoulos, will take over the leadership of the club and the team will find in his face the president who had not never. So, in the 1988–89 season, Paniliakos will make a walk and win the rally in Delta Ethniki, meeting only resistance from the fellow citizen. Tower '79 and gradually starting his journey towards the return. During the 1989–90 season, Paniliakos will compete in Delta Ethniki and will win the championship with Juan Ramón Rocha as a coach-coach, in a year when the Tower team scored a record number of tickets. In the season 1993–94, Paniliakos will finish first in the 3rd National Division breaking all records with 24 wins and only 4 defeats, and completed the league with 91 goals active against just 25 goals pass, thus, the ticket for the 2nd National. In the period 1994–95, Paniliakos will return (after 11 years absence) to the 2nd National. With his roster as a landmark player for Greek football, such as Predrag Đorđević, Zoran Slišković and Stelios Giannakopoulos, will finish first in the league and will become the first and only team to date in Elis that will have played in A National.

Recent years 
The Pyrgos team will immediately gain the appreciation of the audience thanks to the beautiful and passionate football that will be presented, while the world of Pyrgos and Elis, in general, will stand beside it by flooding the National Stadium Pyrgos. The 1996–97 season will undoubtedly be the best year for Paniliakos after finishing in 7th with 13 wins and in the first round the team will be placed in the top positions of the table. Paniliakos' presence in Ethniki will continue until 2000–01, when the team, after 6 years of continuous presence and amazing performances, wins historical victories against all major Greek football teams, will return to the 2nd National a notorious barrage with Panachaiki where Paniliakos witnessed an inexplicable arbitration, which left no room for doubt as to which team would be devalued.
In the 2 nd National, Paniliakos would stay for 2 years as in 2003–04, Paniliakos would return to the 1st National. Unfortunately, this time, the presence of the team in the "big lounges" would only last for one year, after the end of the season he would find Paniliakos in the penultimate position of the scoring and with the offensive offensive for every Pyrgos fan- follower of the team, last match with Panathinaikos, who would finalize the downgrading of the team to the 2nd National. A fight, which was banned from entering the fans and fans of Panileiakos by the team administration.
After 2004, the team's progress was declining, facing huge economic problems and reaching the demo to the 4th National. In the 2009–10 season, Paniliakos will finish 1st in the 6th Group of the 4th National Team, thus climbing to the 3rd National and filling again with hopes for the future fans-fans, who continued to be next to it and support their favorite team.
In 2012–13, Paniliakos will win the rally in the 2nd National Championship, after the restructuring of the championships. In the next few years, they will find the team of various executives who will try to exploit their involvement in their management team for their benefit and lead Paniliakos to the most black side of his story, as in the middle of the 2014 season / 15 will be forced to withdraw from the 2nd National Championship, while in the 2015–16 season the team will not be able to go down to the Third National Championship, remaining inactive and relegated to A1 FCA Elis.
However, this year, Paniliakos will find a new administration, consisting of a group of important businessmen in the city, aiming at the immediate return of the team to the National categories, as well as the joy and optimism of the team returning to the group's friends of the Tower.

Season to season

Participation history
Super League Greece (7): 1995–2001, 2003–2004
Football League (12): 1972–1975, 1976–1977, 1982–1983, 1994–1995, 2001–2003, 2004–2006, 2013–2015
Gamma Ethniki (27): 1965–1967, 1969–1972, 1975–1976, 1977–1982, 1983–1987, 1990–1994, 2006–2007, 2010–2013, 2017–2020, 2022–present
Delta Ethniki (6): 1987–1988, 1989–1990, 1975–1976, 1977–1982, 1983–1987, 2007–2010 
Local Championships (3): 1988–1989, 2016–2017, 2020–2022

Players

Current squad

Notable players 

For details on former players, see :Category:Paniliakos F.C. players

Notable coaches

References

External links
Paniliakos A.C. - Official Website
Paniliakos F.C. Blog Official
Paniliakos Blog
Paniliakos Athens Club
Red Boys Club Gate3

 
Association football clubs established in 1958
1958 establishments in Greece
Football clubs in Western Greece